Futari was a monthly sport magazine with a special reference to association football published in Finland. The magazine was started in 1982. It was the organ of the Football Association of Finland. It had its headquarters in Helsinki and was published on the first day of each month. Its publisher was Markkinointiviestintä Dialogi Oy, a subsidiary of A-lehdet Group. In 2010 Futari merged with another sport magazine, Football, to form Maali!.

See also
List of magazines in Finland

References

1982 establishments in Finland
2010 disestablishments in Finland
Association football magazines
Defunct magazines published in Finland
Finnish-language magazines
Magazines established in 1982
Magazines disestablished in 2010
Magazines published in Helsinki
Monthly magazines published in Finland